Anna Sergeyevna Layevska (born January 10, 1982), known as Ana Layevska, is a Mexican actress and singer, born in Ukraine.

Early life
Born in Kyiv, Ukraine, Ana is the only child of violinist Serhii Laievskyi and actress Inna Rastsvetaeva. In 1987, Ana and her family moved from Kyiv to Moscow, and in 1991 they moved to Mexico. She started playing the violin when she was five and started acting upon moving to Mexico.

Career
In Mexico she studied acting in the Centro de Educación Artística of Televisa. Thanks to her skills she obtained some roles in videoclips like "Carolina" by singer David and telenovelas such as Alguna vez tendremos alas (1997), Preciosa (1998) and Amor Gitano (1999), acting with Mauricio Islas and Mariana Seoane. Those were relatively small roles but they were good experience as well.

Eventually, producer Pedro Damián called her to participate in telenovelas Primer amor... a mil por hora (2000), in which she shared credits with Anahí, Kuno Becker, Mauricio Islas and Valentino Lanús. She won the TVyNovelas Award for best female revelation, as well as the Palmas de Oro prize in the same category.

In 2001, she starred in her first film, In the Time of the Butterflies, where she had the opportunity of acting with  Salma Hayek and Edward James Olmos. In 2005, she participated in the reality TV show Bailando Por Un Sueño, where celebrities are paired with contestants in a dance-based competition. Despite being unpopular with the judges, she was saved from eviction three times by public telephone voting, eventually placing third overall.

Her most recent appearance is in the hit telenovela El Fantasma de Elena as Elena Calcaño from Telemundo Studios.
She played her second main villain role in Telemundo's Mi Corazón Insiste alongside of Jencarlos Canela, Carmen Villalobos, and Angelica Maria.

In 2012, she played in Telemundo's Relaciones Peligrosas as Paty, a main role, alongside Sandra Echeverría, Maritza Bustamante and Gabriel Coronel.

In 2013, she starred  in Telemundo's Dama y obrero, as Ignacia Santamaria, the lead protagonist, alongside José Luis Reséndez and Fabián Ríos.

In 2016 she returned to Televisa as Camila Borges the main antagonist of the series Sin rastro de ti, alongside Adriana Louvier and Danilo Carrera.

Personal life
Other than acting, Layevska also sings and plays two instruments: violin and piano. When she was younger, she took classes in classical music.

She is fluent in Russian, Spanish and English.

Filmography

Television

Awards and nominations

 2015: The magazine People en Español named as one of "50 Most Beautiful".

References

External links
 
 Ana Layevska at the Telenovela Database
  Esmas

1982 births
Living people
Mexican telenovela actresses
Mexican television actresses
Mexican violinists
20th-century Mexican actresses
21st-century Mexican actresses
Mexican people of Russian descent
Mexican people of Ukrainian descent
Naturalized citizens of Mexico
Musicians from Kyiv
Actresses from Moscow
21st-century violinists